Harry Lancaster Towe (November 3, 1898 in Jersey City, New Jersey – February 4, 1991 in Tenafly, New Jersey) was an American Republican Party politician who represented New Jersey's 9th congressional district in the United States House of Representatives for four terms from 1943 to 1951.

Early life and career
Born in Jersey City, New Jersey, November 3, 1898, Towe attended the public schools of Passaic, New Jersey. He attended the United States Naval Academy from 1918 to 1920 and graduated from New Jersey Law School at Newark in 1925.

He was admitted to the bar the same year and commenced practice in Rutherford, New Jersey. Towe was United States commissioner from 1929 to 1931 and special assistant attorney general of New Jersey from 1931 to 1934. He was a member of the New Jersey General Assembly in 1941 and 1942.

Congress
Towe was elected as a Republican to the Seventy-eighth and to the four succeeding Congresses and served from January 3, 1943, until his resignation September 7, 1951, to become an assistant attorney general of New Jersey, in which capacity he served until October 31, 1953.

Later career and death
He engaged in the practice of law in Hackensack, New Jersey and was secretary and general counsel of the publishing firm of Medical Economics, Inc. from 1960 to 1969. He was a resident of Kinnelon, New Jersey until his death on February 4, 1991, at his home in Lakewood Township, New Jersey.

References

External links

1898 births
1991 deaths
Republican Party members of the New Jersey General Assembly
New Jersey lawyers
Politicians from Jersey City, New Jersey
People from Kinnelon, New Jersey
People from Lakewood Township, New Jersey
Republican Party members of the United States House of Representatives from New Jersey
20th-century American politicians
20th-century American lawyers